Xinguara is a municipality in the state of Pará in the Northern region of Brazil.

Transportation 
The locality is served by the Xinguara Municipal Airport .

See also 
List of municipalities in Pará

References

Municipalities in Pará